Antimony triiodide is the chemical compound with the formula SbI3.  This ruby-red solid is the only characterized "binary" iodide of antimony, i.e. the sole compound isolated with the formula SbxIy. It contains antimony in its +3 oxidation state. Like many iodides of the heavier main group elements, its structure depends on the phase.  Gaseous SbI3 is a molecular, pyramidal species as anticipated by VSEPR theory.  In the solid state, however, the Sb center is surrounded by an octahedron of six iodide ligands, three of which are closer and three more distant.   For the related compound BiI3, all six Bi—I distances are equal.

Production
It may be formed by the reaction of antimony with elemental iodine, or the reaction of antimony trioxide with hydroiodic acid.

Alternatively, it may be prepared by the interaction of antimony and iodine in boiling benzene or tetrachloroethane.

Uses
SbI3 has been used as a dopant in the preparation of thermoelectric materials.

References

External links

Iodides
Metal halides
Antimony(III) compounds